The badminton mixed doubles tournament at the 2010 Asian Games in Guangzhou took place from 17 November to 21 November at Tianhe Gymnasium.

Schedule
All times are China Standard Time (UTC+08:00)

Results

Final

Top half

Bottom half

References 
 Results
Asian Games Complete Results

External links 
 Official site
 Bracket

Badminton at the 2010 Asian Games